Sophronia grandii is a moth of the family Gelechiidae. It was described by Erich Martin Hering in 1933. It is found in Spain and Italy.

References

Moths described in 1933
Sophronia (moth)